Yoram Yosefsberg (born 2 May 1963) is an Israeli actor and voice actor.

Biography
Yosefsberg's voice is best known for his dubbing works in many animated TV shows and feature films, including Megatron in the Transformers series, Gantu in the Lilo & Stitch series, and Major Monogram in Phineas and Ferb. As an actor, Yosefberg portrayed cops in Teddy Productions series such as Shemesh, HaPijamot and Ha'Nephilim.

Yosefsberg also provided a voice role in a game called Counter-Strike: Global Offensive as the IDF on the Counter Terrorist team, they appear in the maps called "Dust", "Dust 2" and "Shortdust".

Filmography

Dubbing

Animation and Live-Action TV
 A.T.O.M. (Additional Characters)
 Adventure Time (Additional Characters)
 Adventures of Sonic the Hedgehog (Doctor Ivo Robotnik)
 American Dragon: Jake Long (Fu Dog)
 Anatole (Additional Characters)
 Angel's Friends (Malachi)
 Angelina Ballerina (Additional Voices (Season 1))
 Animalia (Tyrannicus)
 Anne of Green Gables (Jerry, Additional Characters)
 Atomic Betty (Maximus I.Q.)
 Avatar: The Last Airbender (Additional Characters)
 Avenger Penguins (Caractacus P. Doom (2nd Voice))
 Babar and the Adventures of Badou (Lord Rataxes)
 Back at the Barnyard (Goat, Additional Characters)
 Bakugan Battle Brawlers
 Bakugan: New Vestroia (Gorem, Helios, Elico)
 Bakugan: Gundalian Invaders (Aranaut)
 Bakugan: Mechtanium Surge (Taylean, Helios, Zenthon, Jaakor, Mutabird, Tremblar, Chromopod)
 Batman Series
 Batman: The Animated Series (Additional Characters)
 Batman Beyond (Additional Characters)
 The Batman (Additional Characters)
 Batman: The Brave and the Bold (Aquaman (Season 1), Two-Face, Additional Super heroes and Viilians, Additional Characters)
 Ben 10
 Ben 10 (DiamondHead, Vilgax, Hex, Additional Characters)
 Ben 10: Alien Force (DiamondHead, Vilgax)
 Ben 10: Omniverse (Diamondhead, Crashhopper, Kickin Hawk)
 Ben and Holly's Little Kingdom (Narrator, Additional Characters)
 Bigfoot Presents: Meteor and the Mighty Monster Trucks (Bigfoot)
 Bobobo-bo Bo-bobo (Captain Battleship)
 Bolts and Blip (Ti-Grr Jaxxon)
 Bratz (Additional Characters)
 Buzz Lightyear of Star Command (Warp Darkmatter)
 Cars Toons: Mater's Tall Tales (Additional Characters)
 Cedric (Additional Voices)
 Daigunder (Daigunder, Bullion)
 Dennis the Menace (Ruff (2nd Voice), Additional Characters)
 Digimon Series
 Digimon Adventure 02 (Narrator, BlackWarGreymon, MaloMyotismon, Additional Voices)
 Digimon Tamers (Mitsuo Yamaki (episodes 41 onwards), Zhuqiaomon)
 Digimon Frontier (Grumblemon, Duskmon)
 Digimon Data Squad (Commander Sampson, Additional Voices)
 Digimon Fusion (Tactimon, Additional Voices)
 Dora the Explorer (Additional Characters (Season 1))
 Dragon Ball Z (Dodoria, Burter, Nappa (Episode 104), Android 16, West Kaiou (1st Voice), Spopovitch)
 Dragon Ball GT (General Rilldo)
 Dragon Ball Super (Beerus)
 Dragon Booster (Word Paynn)
 Eliot Kid (Additional Characters)
 Fanboy & Chum Chum (Mr. Hank Mufflin)
 Fantastic Four: World's Greatest Heroes (Doctor Doom)
 Finley the Fire Engine (Suds)
 Fireman Sam (Trevor Evans)
 Flipper and Lopaka (Bomana, Nip)
 Foster's Home for Imaginary Friends (Additional Characters (Season 1))
 Gadget and the Gadgetinis (Colonel Nozzaire)
 Galactic Football (General Bleylock (2nd Voice))
 Generator Rex (Bobo Haha, Skalamander)
 Geronimo Stilton (Additional Characters)
 Gormiti (Additional Characters)
 Growing Up Creepie (Vincent "Vinnie" Creecher)
 Henry Hugglemonster (Grando, Eduardo Enormomonster)
 Hi Hi Puffy AmiYumi (Additional Characters)
 Horseland (Old Horse)
 Hot Wheels Battle Force 5 (Captain Kalus, Kyrosys, Zeke)
 Inami (Phintos)
 Inspector Gadget (Dr. Claw (2nd Voice), Corporal Capeman, MAD Agents and Additional Characters)
 Jack's Big Music Show (Additional Characters)
 Jackie Chan Adventures (Ratso)
 Jacob Two-Two (Leo Louse, Hooded Fang)
 Johnny Test (Mr. Black, The General, Mr. Henry Teacherman, Additional Characters)
 Jimmy Two-Shoes (Additional Characters)
 Jungle Junction (Dozer)
 Justice League (Additional Characters)
 Justice League Unlimited (Additional Characters)
 Kassai and Leuk (Additional Characters)
 Kid Paddle (Additional Characters)
 Kim Possible (Dr. James Timothy Possible, Steven Barkin, Additional Characters)
 Kung Fu Panda: Legends of Awesomeness (Temutai, Additional Characters)
 LazyTown (Robbie Rotten)
 League of Super Evil (Additional Characters)
 Legion of Super Heroes (Additional Characters)
 Leonard (Additional Characters)
 Lilo & Stitch: The Series (Gantu, Additional Characters)
 Stitch! (Gantu, Additional Characters)
 Martin Morning (Additional Characters)
 Medabots (Dr. Meta-Evil, Space Medafighter X (Season 1), Seaslug (Season 2))
 MegaMan NT Warrior (Masa, GutsMan, TorchMan, HeatMan, PlanetMan, DrillMan, Additional Characters)
 Mickey Mouse (Goofy)
 Mickey Mouse Clubhouse (Goofy)
 Minnie's Bow-Toons (Goofy)
 Monster Allergy (Magnacat, Narrator)
 Mr. Bogus (Dirt Dudes)
 Muddle Earth (Dr. Cuddles)
 My Friends Tigger & Pooh (Eeyore)
 Naruto (Additional Characters)
 Oban Star-Racers (Additional Characters)
 Once Upon a Time... The Discoverers (The Pest)
 Once Upon a Time... Space (Additional Characters)
 One Piece (Roronoa Zoro, Gold Roger, Zeff, Gaimon, Additional Characters)
 Oobi (Grampu)
 Phineas and Ferb (Major Monogram, Norm, Grandpa Clyde, Grandpa Reginald, Candace Flynn (Allergy Voice), Additional Characters)
 Take Two with Phineas and Ferb (Howie Mandel, Tom Bergeron)
 Pink Panther and Sons (Additional Characters)
 Pippy Longstocking (Capt. Longstocking)
 Pokémon Series
 Pokémon: The Johto Journeys (Mr. Parker/Gligarman, Kurt)
 Pokémon: Advanced Battle (Maxie)
 Popeye and Son (Bluto)
 Power Rangers Lost Galaxy (Damon Henderson/Green Lost Galaxy Ranger (Reggie Rolle))
 Pucca (Master Soo, Santa Claus, Policeman Bruce)
 Redakai: Conquer the Kairu (Lokar)
 Sgt. Frog (Giroro, Kogoro, Viper, Masayoshi Yoshiokadaira (Season 1), Narrator, Additional Characters)
 Sitting Ducks (Additional Characters)
 Shaman King (Ryu, Mosuke (1st Voice))
 Shaolin Wuzang (Additional Characters)
 Shinzo (Hakuba, Lanancuras, Narrator (First Episode))
 SimsalaGrimm (Magic Book, Narrator (Season 2), Additional Characters)
 Skunk Fu! (Dragon, Mr. Fish, Praying Mantis)
 Slugterra (Dr. Thaddius Blakk)
 Sonic X (Chuck Thorndyke, Dark Oak, Additional Characters)
 Spider-Man Series
 Spider-Man Unlimited (High Evolutionary)
 Ultimate Spider-Man (Stan the Janitor, Doctor Doom)
 Spike Team (Additional Characters)
 SpongeBob SquarePants (Mermaid Man (Episode 67), The Flying Dutchman (Episode 70), Patchy the Pirate (Episode 93), Additional Characters)
 Strange Hill High (Additional Characters)
 Supa Strikas (Coach, Spenza)
 Super Pig (Theodorix Pig)
 Tara Duncan: The Evil Empress (Master Chem)
 Teenage Mutant Ninja Turtles (1987 TV series) (Bebop (2nd Voice), Lord Dregg)
 Teenage Mutant Ninja Turtles (2003 TV series) (Master Khan, Additional Characters)
 The Adventures of Tintin (Captain Haddock)
 The Avengers: Earth's Mightiest Heroes (Bruce Banner / Hulk)
 The Emperor's New School (Pacha, Kavo, Additional Characters)
 The Fantastic Voyages of Sinbad the Sailor (Additional Characters)
 The Jungle Book (Shere Khan)
 The Legend of Snow White (Goldie, Samson, King Conrad)
 The Legend of Tarzan (Additional Characters)
 The Life and Times of Juniper Lee (Loki, Stephen "Steve" the Sandman)
 The Magician (Black Jack)
 The New Adventures of Lucky Luke (Additional Characters)
 The Penguins of Madagascar (Joey, Bada, Max, The Rat King, Additional Characters)
 The Powerpuff Girls (Ace, Valhallen (Episode 44), Additional Voices)
 The Power Team (Mr. Big)
 The Ren & Stimpy Show (Muddy Mudskipper, Powdered Toast Man, Mr Horse and Additional Characters)
 The Replacements (Conrad Fleem, Additional Characters)
 The Super Hero Squad Show (Doctor Doom)
 The Sylvester & Tweety Mysteries (Hector)
 TigerSharks
 Tinga Tinga Tales (Lion)
 Tokyo Mew Mew (Professor Shirogane)
 Tom & Jerry Kids (Additional Characters)
 Totally Spies! (Additional Characters)
 Transformers Series (Megatron, Galvatron (Except Animated and PrimeOnly))
 The Transformers
 Transformers: Robots in Disguise (Fortress Maximus, Rollbar)
 Transformers: Armada
 Transformers: Cybertron
 Transformers Animated (Ratchet (Episode 6, First Line Only))
 Transformers: Prime
 T.U.F.F. Puppy (The Chief)
 Turbo Dogs (GT)
 Ultimate Book of Spells (Zarlack)
 Viewtiful Joe (Inferno Lord Fire Leo, Almighty Leader)
 What's New, Scooby-Doo? (Additional Characters)
 Winx Club (Mike, Baltor, Additional Characters)
 Yin Yang Yo! (The Night Master, Ultimoose)
 Yo-kai Watch (Whisper)
 Young Justice (Sportsmaster, Additional Characters)

Animated and Live Action Films/Direct-To-Video Films
 101 Dalmatians II: Patch's London Adventure (Additional Voices)
 9 (8/Eight)
 Alice in Wonderland (Jabberwocky, Frog Servant)
An American Tail: Fievel Goes West (Cat R. Waul)
 Andre (Billy Baker (Keith Szarabajka))
 Anastasia (Additional Voices)
 Animals United (Socrates the Lion)
 Arthur and the Invisibles (Chief (Jean Betote Njamba))
 Arthur and the Revenge of Maltazard (Chief (Jean Betote Njamba))
 Arthur 3: The War of the Two Worlds (Chief (Jean Betote Njamba))
 Astro Boy (Robotsky)
 Atlantis: The Lost Empire (Jebidiah Allerdyce "Cookie" Farnsworth)
 Babar: The Movie (Rataxes)
 Barnyard (Miles)
 Bartok the Magnificent (Zozi)
 Batman Film Series
 Batman: Mask of the Phantasm (Thug)
 The Batman vs. Dracula (Additional Voices)
 Battle For Terra (General Hemmer)
 Bee Movie (Additional Voices)
 Ben 10: Secret of the Omnitrix (Vilgax)
 Ben 10: Destroy All Aliens (Diamondhead)
 Ben 10/Generator Rex: Heroes United (Diamondhead)
 Beverly Hills Chihuahua (Delgado)
 Bionicle 2: Legends of Metru Nui (Toa Lhikan)
 Bolt (Additional Voices)
 Buzz Lightyear of Star Command: The Adventure Begins (Warp Darkmatter)
 Brave (King Fergus)
 Brother Bear (Moose 1#)
 Brother Bear 2 (Additional Voices)
 Camp Rock 2: The Final Jam (Axel Turner (Daniel Kash))
 Cars (Harv)
 Cars 2 (Rod "Torque" Redline, Crabby the Boat, Additional Voices)
 Cats & Dogs: The Revenge of Kitty Galore (Sam, Cat Inamte, Bomb Squirrel)
 Chicken Little ("Ace")
 City of Ember (Additional Voices)
 Cloudy with a Chance of Meatballs (Officer Earl Devereaux)
 Coraline (Additional Voices)
 Daffy Duck's Fantastic Island (The Wishing Well)
 Digimon: The Movie (Wendigomon, Antylamon, Cherubimon)
 Dinotopia: Quest for the Ruby Sunstone (Albagon, T-Rex)
 Dinosaur (Kron)
 Dolphin Tale (Fisherman (Richard Libertini))
 Dragon Ball Movies
 Dragon Ball: Mystical Adventure (Master Shen)
 Dragon Ball Z: Dead Zone (Nicky)
 Dragon Ball Z: The World's Strongest (Misokatsun)
 Dragon Ball Z: Cooler's Revenge (Cooler)
 Dragon Ball Z: Return of Cooler (Meta Cooler)
 Dragon Ball Z: Super Android 13! (Android 15)
 Dragon Hunters (Lord Arnold)
 El Cid: The Legend (Ben Yussuf)
 Ella Enchanted (Koopootuk (Alvaro Lucchesi), Additional Voices)
 Enchanted (Additional Voices)
 Everyone's Hero (Additional Voices)
 Finding Nemo (Bruce)
 Flushed Away (Additional Voices)
 Fly Me to the Moon (Additional Voices)
 Free Willy (Dwight Mercer (Mykelti Williamson)
 Gnomeo & Juliet (Terrafirminator V.O.)
 Happily N'Ever After (Big Chef, Dwarves Leader)
 Happy Feet (Boss Skua)
 Happy Feet Two (Boss Skua)
 Harry Potter and the
Chamber of Secrets (Aragog)
 Home on the Range (Junior the Buffalo)
 Hoodwinked! (Chief Ted Grizzly)
 Hop (Hugh Hefner, Jimmy Carter of The Blind Boys of Alabama)
 How to Train Your Dragon (Viking Voices)
 Howl's Moving Castle (Additional Voices)
 Ice Age (franchise) (Diego)
 Ice Age
 Ice Age: The Meltdown
 Ice Age: Dawn of the Dinosaurs
 Ice Age: A Mammoth Christmas
 Ice Age: Continental Drift
 Igor (Buzz Offman)
Joseph: King of Dreams (Pharaoh)
 Kronk's New Groove (Papi)
 Kung Fu Panda (Tai Lung)
 Kung Fu Panda 2 (Po's Father)
 Kung Fu Panda 3 (Kai)
 Legend of the Guardians: The Owls of Ga'Hoole (Metal Beak)
 Legends of Valhalla: Thor (Odin)
 Lilo & Stitch (film series)
 Lilo & Stitch (Gantu)
 Stitch! The Movie (Gantu)
 Madagascar: Escape 2 Africa (Teetsi, Additional Voices)
 Mary Poppins (Additional Voices)
 Megamind (Additional Voices)
 Mars Needs Moms (Additional Voices)
Midsummer Dream (Demetrius)
 Monster House (Additional Voices)
 Monsters vs. Aliens (Additional Voices)
 My Little Pony: The Movie (Grundle King, The Smooze)
Niko & The Way to the Stars (Dasher)
 Nim's Island (Additional Voices)
 Open Season (film series) (Ian)
 Open Season
 Open Season 2
 ParaNorman (Additional Voices)
 Phineas and Ferb the Movie: Across the 2nd Dimension (Major Francis Monogram/Monogram-2, Norm/Norm-2, Candace-2 (Allergy Voice), Additional Voices)
 Peter Pan (Pirates)
 Planes (Skipper Riley)
 Planet 51 (General Grawl)
 Pokémon Movie Series:
 Pokémon: The First Movie (Giovanni)
 Pokémon: The Movie 2000 (Slowking)
 Pokémon 3: The Movie (Doctor Spencer Hale/Entei)
 Pokémon: Arceus and the Jewel of Life (Damos)
 Racing Stripes (Tucker)
 Rango (Rattlesnake Jake)
 Ratatouille (Horst)
 Robots (Fire Hydrant)
 Rock-a-Doodle (The Grand Duke)
 Sammy's Adventures: The Secret Passage (Additional Voices)
 Scary Godmother: Halloween Spooktacular (Harry The Werewolf)
 Shark Bait (Nerissa)
 Sharpay's Fabulous Adventure (Vance Evans (Robert Curtis Brown)
 Shrek Series (Big Bad Wolf)
 Shrek 2 (Additional Voices)
 Shrek the Third (Additional Voices)
 Shrek the Halls
 Shrek Forever After (Brogan the Ogre)
 Sinbad: Beyond the Veil of Mists (Mustafa, Guard Captain)
Sinbad: Legend of the Seven Seas (Additional Voices)
 Space Buddies (Additional Voices)
 Space Chimps (Houston)
 Space Chimps 2: Zartog Strikes Back (Houston)
 Space Jam (Monster Pound, Larry Johnson)
 Speed Racer (Racer X (Matthew Fox))
 Spirit: Stallion of the Cimarron (Additional Voices)
 Spirited Away (Additional Voices)
 Spy Kids 2: The Island of Lost Dreams (Romero (Steve Buscemi))
 Spy Kids 3-D: Game Over (Romero (Steve Buscemi), Isador "Machete" Cortez (Danny Trejo), Alexander Minion (Tony Shalhoub))
 Stuart Little (Race Announcer)
 Stuart Little 2 (Falcon)
 Surf's Up (Tank "The Shredder" Evans)
 Tangled (Stabbington brother)
 Tarzan II (Uto)
 The Adventures of Tintin (Captain Haddock)
The Angry Birds Movie 2 (Hank)
 The Ant Bully (Stan Beals)
 The Boy Who Wanted to Be a Bear (Papa Bear, Buffalo, Spirit of the Wind)
 The Cat in the Hat (Additional Voices)
 The Chronicles of Narnia (film series)
 The Chronicles of Narnia: The Lion, the Witch and the Wardrobe (Father Christmas (James Cosmo))
 The Chronicles of Narnia: Prince Caspian (Lord Sopespian (Damian Alcazar))
 The Chronicles of Narnia: The Voyage of the Dawn Treader (Aslan)
 The Gruffalo (The Gruffalo)
 The Gruffalo's Child (The Gruffalo)
 The Hunchback of Notre Dame II (Sarousch)
 The Incredibles (Rick Dicker)
 Jack-Jack Attack (Rick Dicker)
 The Jungle Book 2 (Additional Voices)
The Legend of Secret Pass (Calabar)
 The Little Mermaid: Ariel's Beginning (Ray-Ray)
 The Muppets (Tex Richman (Chris Cooper))
 The Polar Express (Elf)
 The Powerpuff Girls Movie (Ace)
 The Princess and the Frog (James)
 The Real Shlemiel (Lekish, Tudras)
 The Road to El Dorado (Tzekel-Kan)
 The Simpsons Movie (Arnold Schwarzenegger)
 The Spiderwick Chronicles (Red Cap)
 The SpongeBob SquarePants Movie (Victor (Thug Club Leader), Additional Voices)
 The Swan Princess II: Escape from Castle Mountain (Knuckles)
 The Sword in the Stone (Sir Ector)
 The Tale of Despereaux (Additional Voices)
 The Three Musketeers (Comte de Rochefort)
 The Transformers: The Movie (Perceptor, Megatron, Galvatron)
 The Ugly Duckling and Me! (Ernie)
 The Water Horse: Legend of the Deep (Lewis Mowbray (Ben Chaplin))
 The Wild (Samson)
 Thomas and the Magic Railroad (Diesel 10)
 Thunderbirds (The Hood (Ben Kingsley))
 Tinker Bell and the Lost Treasure (Owl)
 Titan A.E (Additional Voices)
 TMNT (Thief Leader)
 Tom and Jerry film Series
 Tom and Jerry: The Magic Ring (Freddie, Butch (2nd Voice), Diamond Cutter)
 Tom and Jerry: Blast Off to Mars (Commander Bristle, Martian Scientist)
 Tom and Jerry: The Fast and the Furry (Frank, Guard)
 Tom and Jerry: A Nutcracker Tale (Butch (First Lines), Additional Voices)
 Tony Hawk in Boom Boom Sabotage (Frank)
 Top Cat: The Movie (Griswald)
 Totally Spies! The Movie (Yuri, Pappy)
 Toy Story 3 (Sarge, Chunk)
 Treasure Planet (Billy Bones)
 Up (Nurse AJ)
 Valiant (Jacques, Additional Voices)
 WALL-E (Additional Voices)
 Winx Club films (Mike)
 Winx Club: The Secret of the Lost Kingdom
 Winx Club 3D: Magical Adventure
 Wreck-It Ralph (M. Bison, General Hologram)
 Yogi Bear (Narrator)
 Yona Yona Penguin (Buka-Boo)
 Zambezia (Budzo)
 Zookeeper (Joe The Lion)

Games
 Tiny Toon Adventures: Buster and the Beanstalk (Additional Voices)
 Counter Strike: Global Offensive (IDF Radio Voice)

Acting

TV Shows
  (Huchberg)
 Ha'Nephilim (Malkishua)
  (Professor Bloom)
 HaPijamot (Shlomi)
 Inyan Shel Zman (Miron the Soundman)
  (Zorkin Trio)
  (Sasson)
  (Policeman)
 Shemesh (Gil)
  (Married Man)

References

External links

1963 births
Living people
Beit Zvi School for the Performing Arts alumni
Israeli male television actors
Israeli male voice actors
Male actors from Tel Aviv